The 2012 United States presidential primaries can refer to:

2012 Democratic Party presidential primaries
2012 Republican Party presidential primaries